The  is the decoration for officers in the Japan Self-Defense Forces. Officials may wear it on their uniforms while in active service. They are only cordons like the Unit Awards and the Unit Citations of United States Armed Forces.

The appearance of the defensive memorial cordon is similar to ribbon bars for military decorations but is completely different from regular ribbon bars, and are not awards or medals. The defensive memorial cordon is a 'rectangular-shaped memorial souvenir' for service career, participation of training in overseas, and participation in international peacekeeping and assistance operations.

History

Before establishment
After World War II, the standard for conferment of a decoration was changed and JSDF officials in active service were excluded from the now-civilian orders and decorations. In addition, the JSDF could not gain opportunity to participate battle because it is prohibited by Chapter 9 of the Constitution of Japan.　

Just after the JSDF was established in 1954, there were some officials who had military decorations and ribbon bars awarded by Imperial Japanese Army, so they wore in formal ceremony. They retired as time goes on, and no one could wear the military decorations with entitlement. For this reason, the officers in the JSDF in the 1970s had to participate in international meetings without any decorations.

Establishment

On April 1, 1982, the system for Defensive memorial cordon was established to keep balance of looking between Japanese and foreign servicemen. When the system for Defensive memorial cordon was established, there were only 15 types of cordons, unlike past decorations the cordons are only used by officers of the JSDF.

Requirements
The following Self-Defense Force officers in active service are allowed to wear the defensive memorial cordon:
Officers who receive an official commendation by the Japan Self-Defense Forces
Officers who serve duties about the concerned awarding at the awarded institutions (National Defense Academy, National Defense Medical College, National Institute for Defense Studies, Technical Research and Development Institute, Equipment Procurement and Construction Office, the military units, the military institutions, a branch offices of Equipment office)
Officers who are commanders of units and commands or other managerial positions established by the Minister of Defense.
Officers who serve duties at the internal Subdivisions (Internal Subdivisions in Ministry of Defense, Section of the Joint Staffs, Defense Intelligence Headquarters, Ground Staff Office, Maritime Staff Office, Air Staff Office, Technical Research and Development Institute, Equipment Procurement and Construction Office, Inspector General's Office of Legal Compliance)
Long serving officers. In this case, the officials who were awarded the prize of perfect attendance.
Officers who work at the diplomatic missions overseas, or who were engaged duties about procurement by onerous assistance or other overseas activities as may be ordered.
Officers who participate in overseas training missions and exercises or work for transporting to the South Pole.
Officers who participate in international cooperation activities, such as peacekeeping operations, disaster relief and joint training exercises with foreign armed forces.
Officers who participate in national events or cooperating work of sports competitions which are regulated in Self-Defense Forces Act Chapter 126-12 (Olympic Games, Asian Games, National Sports Festival, FIFA World Cup, etc.) as may be directed by General Headquarters, JSDF

Types of cordons
There are today 41 cordons. When the system for the defensive memorial cordon was established, there were only 15 cordons. They must be worn by ascending order. Male officials wear three cordons for each line, and female officials wear two cordons for each line. If the foreign Orders and/or decorations are awarded to officers, these take precedence over the cordons and are required to be placed above them.

Some cordons (marked as grey) still exist, but it is impossible to meet their requirements as either the organizations in question have been abolished or the missions have been finished.

Rules for multiple awardees
If the same cordons are to be awarded for further actions officers qualified to receive them have to put gold or silver cherry blossoms on the cordons.

1 silver cherry blossom for 2 cordons.
1 gold cherry blossom for 3 cordons.
2 silver cherry blossoms for 4 cordons.
2 gold cherry blossoms for more than 4 cordons.

Notes

References

External links

Defensive Memorial Cordon

Military awards and decorations of Japan